Tariq Jaafar Al-Farsani (born in Manama, Bahrain, 1972) is a Bahraini bodybuilder.
In April 2011 he was arrested after allegedly taking part in pro-democracy reform protests in Bahrain in February 2011.  He was detained indefinitely without charge.  As of July 2011 his fate is unclear.

International competitions
 1998 Asian Amateur Championships — IFBB, Light-Heavyweight, Did not place
 2002 Asian Amateur Championships — IFBB, Light-Heavyweight, 1st
 2002 Asian Games, Light-Heavyweight, 1st
 2004 Asian Amateur Championships — IFBB, Light-Heavyweight, 1st
 2007 World Amateur Championships — IFBB, Light-Heavyweight, Disqualified
2008 World Bodybuilding Championships (Manama, Bahrain) — Silver medallist, 90 kg category

2011 detention

On 16 April 2011 Tareq Al-Farsani was reported to be one of the international athletes and other sports personalities arrested by the Bahraini authorities following the pro-democracy reform protests. According to Nabeel Rajab of the Bahrain Centre for Human Rights (BCHR), Tareq Al-Farsani's family were not informed of his whereabouts and were afraid that he may have been tortured. Al-Farsani's sister Faiza was also arrested.

On 29 June 2011 the Bahrain News Agency reported that the Bahrain Defence Force military public prosecutor had announced that "defendants involved at medical and sport crimes" had been released, but trials would continue in accordance with Bahraini legal procedures.

References

1972 births
Living people
Sportspeople from Manama
Bahraini bodybuilders
Asian Games medalists in bodybuilding
Bodybuilders at the 2002 Asian Games
Bodybuilders at the 2006 Asian Games
Asian Games gold medalists for Bahrain
Medalists at the 2002 Asian Games
Medalists at the 2006 Asian Games